The Geelong Cup is a Geelong Racing Club Group 3 Thoroughbred horse race, held under handicap conditions over a distance of 2400 metres at the Geelong Racecourse, Geelong, Victoria, Australia on a Wednesday in late October. The prize money for the race is A$500,000, and the race is considered one of the most reliable guides to the result of the Melbourne Cup.

History
The race is run thirteen days before the Melbourne Cup (which is always on the first Tuesday in November). 
The race has been run on this day since 1947. The day of the race is a public holiday in the city of Geelong. Before 1907 the race was run at the Marshalltown Racecourse. Before 1947 the race was run at various times during the year between January and July.

Distance
 	1872–1885 – 2 miles (~3200 metres)	
	1886–1892 – 1 miles	(~2800 metres)
	1893–1894, 1899, 1970–1971 – 1 miles (~2400 metres)	
	1900, 1965–1969 –	about 1 miles (~2400 metres)	
	1895, 1901–1906, 1910–1911, 1919, 1951–1960 – 1 miles (~2200 metres)	
	1961–1964 – about 1 miles (~2200 metres)
	1927–1934, 1937, 1947–1950 – 10 furlongs & 192 yards (~2187 metres)
	1922–1926  – 10 furlongs  & 182 yards (~2178 metres)
	1896, 1898, 1909, 1916–1917 – 1 miles	(~2000 metres)
	1921 – about 1 miles (~2000 metres)	
	1912–1913, 1915, 1918 – 1 miles (~1800 metres)	 	
	1914  – 1 mile 	(~1600 metres)
	1972–2007 – 2400 metres 
 2008–2009 – 2406 metres
2010 onwards – 2400 metres

Grade
1872–1978 – Principal Race
1979–2001 – Listed race 
2002 onwards – Group 3

Doubles wins
The following thoroughbreds have won the Geelong Cup – Melbourne Cup in the same year.
 Media Puzzle (2002), Americain (2010), Dunaden (2011)

Winners

2022 – Emissary
2021 – Tralee Rose
2020 – Steel Prince
2019 – Prince of Arran
2018 – Runaway
2017 – Vengeur Masque
2016 – Qewy
2015 – Almoonqith
2014 – Caravan Rolls On
2013 – Ibicenco
2012 – Gatewood
2011 – Dunaden
2010 – Americain
2009 – Leica Ding
2008 – Bauer
2007 – The Fuzz
2006 – Mandela
2005 – On A Jeune
2004 – Pacific Dancer
2003 – Zazzman
2002 – Media Puzzle
2001 – Karasi
2000 – Savrocca
1999 – Bohemiath
1998 – Ancient City
1997 – Oregon Star
1996 – Hereditas
1995 – Anfitrion
1994 – Grass Valley
1993 – Ultimate Aim
1992 – Ali Boy
1991 – Newbury Star
1990 – Mr. Brooker
1989 – † Pacific Mirage / Sea Legend
1988 – Our Classic Bay
1987 – Beau Trist
1986 – Fil De Roi
1985 – Koiro Corrie May
1984 – Chagemar
1983 – Deb's Mate
1982 – Gujarat
1981 – Allez Bijou
1980 – Summer Fleur
1979 – Hauberk
1978 – Puramaka
1977 – Brallos
1976 – Taminga
1975 – Dowling Girl
1974 – Special Test
1973 – Australasia
1972 – Hayburner
1971 – Gnapur
1970 – Vansittart
1969 – Double Steel
1968 – Bergman
1967 – Royal Coral
1966 – Craftsman
1965 – Pleasanton
1964 – Jamagne
1963 – Nivek
1962 – Napoleon
1961 – Ursalon
1960 – Tabess
1959 – Paratone
1958 – Mac
1957 – King Boru
1956 – Prince Abbott
1955 – November Moon
1954 – Chidden
1953 – meeting abandoned
1952 – Welkin Sun
1951 – Trust Me
1950 – Purple Prince
1949 – Blank Music
1948 – Royal Scot
1947 – Bruin
1938–46 – race not held
1937 – Lord Carrington
1935–36 – race not held
1934 – † Viol D'Amour / Highway
1933 – Bay of Islands
1932 – Glaive
1931 – El Rey
1930 – race not held
1930 – Taras
1929 – Sea Pilot
1928 – Anan Louise
1927 – Victorian King
1926 – Bombard
1925 – Glaxy
1924 – Lillirie
1923 – Mount Bernard
1922 – Tresco
1921 – Rahda
1920 – race not held
1919 – Luteplayer
1918 – Blackwood
1917 – Mnesarchus
1916 – Lady Mooltan
1915 – Pouter
1914 – Roseview
1913 – Porch
1912 – Roseview
1911 – Crete
1910 – Orline
1909 – Tantalla
1907–08 – race not held
1906 – Maninga
1905 – Cluster
1904 – Mallard
1903 – Telemachus
1902 – Merryman
1901 – Marie Corelli
1900 – Model
1899 – Relic
1898 – Chit Chat
1897 – race not held
1896 – Pivot
1895 – J5
1894 – The Clown
1893 – Newman
1892 – Norbert
1891 – Tantallon
1890 – Britannia
1889 – Malua
1888 – Gardenia
1887 – Camerine
1886 – Claptrap
1885 – Camerine
1884 – Linda
1883 – Gudarz
1882 – Guinea
1881 – Progress
1880 – Zambesi
1879 – Lord Harry
1878 – Newminster
1877 – Pride of the Hills
1876 – Emulation
1875 – Melbourne
1874 – Mccallum Mohn
1873 – Leo
1872 – Flying Scud

† Dead heat

See also
 List of Australian Group races
 Group races

References

External links
Geelong Racing Club
Past winners

Recurring sporting events established in 1872
Sport in Geelong
Tourist attractions in Geelong
Horse races in Australia
Open middle distance horse races
Public holidays in Australia
1872 establishments in Australia
Spring (season) events in Australia